The West Bengal Film Journalists' Association Award for Best Film is given yearly by WBFJA as a part of its annual West Bengal Film Journalists' Association Awards for Bengali films, to recognize the best film of the previous year.

List of winners

See also
 West Bengal Film Journalists' Association Awards
 Cinema of India

References

Awards for best film
West Bengal Film Journalists' Association Awards